Halbrook is a surname. Notable people with the surname include:

Brad Halbrook, American politician
Stephen Halbrook (born 1947), American lawyer and gun rights advocate
Swede Halbrook (1933–1988), American basketball player

See also
Holbrook (name)